The 2018 season was the Cleveland Browns' 66th season in the National Football League (NFL), their 70th overall, their first full season under general manager John Dorsey, and their third and final season under head coach Hue Jackson. The Browns improved upon their 2017 campaign in which they finished 0–16, finishing in 3rd place in the AFC North with a record of 7–8–1, their best record since the 2007 season. However, they missed the playoffs for the 16th consecutive season, having last made the playoffs in 2002.

On September 9, the Browns opened their season against the Pittsburgh Steelers with a 21–21 tie. This was the Browns' first tie since 1989, and it ended a 17-game losing streak which dated back to the 2016 season. On September 20, the Browns defeated the New York Jets 21–17, ending a 19-game winless streak.

On October 29, Jackson was fired after posting a record of 2–5–1 through Week 8 and an overall record of 3–36–1 during his two and a half seasons in Cleveland. Offensive coordinator Todd Haley, who was in his first season with the Browns, was fired the same day. Defensive coordinator Gregg Williams was named interim head coach. Under Williams, the Browns went 5–3 to finish out the season.

Rookie starting quarterback Baker Mayfield threw 27 touchdown passes, breaking the record for the most touchdown passes thrown by a rookie quarterback. The previous record of 26 was shared by Peyton Manning and Russell Wilson, and it was later broken in 2020 by Justin Herbert.

Offseason

Front office changes
On January 2, new general manager John Dorsey hired Green Bay Packers personnel executive Alonzo Highsmith as vice president of football operations.

On January 10, the Browns announced several front office hirings: Eliot Wolf as assistant general manager, Jimmy Noel as assistant director of pro scouting, Matt Donahoe as a scout, and Dan Zegers as personnel coordinator. The Browns also announced that former vice president of player personnel Ken Kovash would switch to a role within the strategy department, and fired senior personnel executive Ryan Grigson.

Coaching changes
On January 10, the Browns released special teams coordinator Chris Tabor. He had been the longest-tenured coach on the Browns, with the team since 2011.

On January 11, the Browns hired Adam Henry as wide receivers coach, a position he held with the New York Giants since 2016. Former wide receivers coach Al Saunders transitioned into a senior advisory role.

On January 12, the Browns hired Ken Zampese as quarterbacks coach. They also fired running backs coach/run game coordinator Kirby Wilson, special teams assistant Shawn Mennenga, and special teams quality control coach Stan Watson.

On January 24, the Browns hired Amos Jones as special teams coordinator, Todd Haley as offensive coordinator, and Freddie Kitchens as running backs/assistant head coach.

On February 8, the Browns hired Sam Shade as assistant special teams coach.

On March 9, the Browns hired former return specialist Josh Cribbs as special teams intern.

Roster changes

Re-signings

Players added

Players lost

Trade notes

Players added and lost
The Browns added and released the following players during the 2018 off-season:

2018 draft class

Undrafted free agents

* Browns claimed player off waivers after he signed as an undrafted free agent with another team and was waived.

Staff

Final roster

Preseason
The Browns opened training camp on July 26. The Browns' training camp and preseason was featured on the HBO series Hard Knocks.

Schedule

Notes
 WR Josh Gordon did not report to the beginning of training camp as part of his "overall health and treatment plan." He returned to the team on August 18.
 On August 29, federal charges were brought against LB Mychal Kendricks for insider trading, in which he allegedly made $1.2 million in profits on illegal trades made between 2014 and 2017. The team released Kendricks on August 30.

Roster cuts
The Browns waived the following players between August 28 and September 1 to get their roster down to the 53-player maximum.

The Browns also traded T Shon Coleman and acquired DT Devaroe Lawrence in a separate trade.

On September 2, the Browns added DT Carl Davis, DE Ifeadi Odenigbo, C Aaron Neary, LB Tanner Vallejo, and Tavierre Thomas, who were all waived by their former teams. To make room on the roster, the Browns waived LB Jermaine Grace, CB Jeremiah McKinnon, DT Jamie Meder, DE Carl Nassib, and C Austin Reiter.

On September 3, the Browns signed Ekuale, Henderson, Hilliard, G Kyle Kalis, TE Pharoah McKever, McKinnon, Meander, Scott, T Brad Seaton, and Shelton to their practice squad. Sankoh, who is part of the NFL's International Player Pathway program, was also added to the practice squad and does not count toward its 10-player limit.

Regular season

Schedule
The Browns' 2018 schedule was announced on April 19.

Note: Intra-division opponents are in bold text.

Game summaries

Week 1: vs. Pittsburgh Steelers

The Browns' defense intercepted Steelers quarterback Ben Roethlisberger three times and recovered three fumbles. Rookie CB Denzel Ward had two of the interceptions for the Browns. Cleveland only had one turnover, with Tyrod Taylor throwing an interception in the 4th quarter. Both teams had a chance to win late in the overtime period, but came up short. Chris Boswell missed a 42-yard field goal for the Steelers, while Browns kicker Zane Gonzalez had his 43-yard attempt blocked with 0:09 left in overtime.

With their first tie since 1989, the Browns started the season at 0–0–1. This tie ended a 17-game losing streak that dated back to the final game of the 2016 season. It also ended streaks of 17 straight losses within the AFC North, 13 straight season-opening losses, and six straight losses to the Steelers. Ward was named the NFL Rookie of the Week for Week 1.

Week 2: at New Orleans Saints

The teams exchanged field goals in the first quarter, then Browns K Zane Gonzalez kicked his second field goal late in the second quarter to give the Browns a 6–3 halftime lead. Carlos Hyde scored a touchdown on a short run to give the Browns a 12–3 lead, but the Saints scored 15 straight points in the fourth quarter to take an 18–12 lead. The Browns answered with a tying touchdown on a 47-yard Tyrod Taylor Hail Mary pass to Antonio Callaway with 1:16 remaining. However, Gonzalez missed the extra point attempt, his second miss of the day, which would have given the Browns the lead. Saints K Wil Lutz nailed a 44-yard game-winner with 0:21 remaining. The Browns drove to give Gonzalez an attempt at a 52-yard field goal to tie the game in the final seconds, but it sailed wide right.

With the loss, the Browns fell to 0–1–1. Their winless streak extended to 19 games.

The next day, the Browns released Gonzalez and signed rookie K Greg Joseph. Joseph played college football at Florida Atlantic and was on the Miami Dolphins' training camp roster. The Browns also traded WR Josh Gordon to the New England Patriots for a 2019 fifth-round selection. If Gordon was not active for at least 10 games for New England the rest of the season, the Browns would also send New England a 2019 seventh-round selection.

Week 3: vs. New York Jets

Rookie quarterback Baker Mayfield entered the game in the 2nd quarter after starter Tyrod Taylor left the game with a concussion. Taylor finished the game 4/14 for 19 yards. Mayfield threw for 201 yards and a caught a pass from receiver Jarvis Landry for a two-point conversion (a Philly Special that had been flipped to account for Landry being left-handed). Carlos Hyde added two touchdown runs including the go-ahead score with just over two minutes remaining. The Jets offense could not respond as QB Sam Darnold threw a pair of interceptions in the Jets' final two drives to preserve the 21–17 win.

With the win, the Browns improved to 1–1–1. This win marked the end of the team's 19-game winless streak and the team's first win in 635 days (their last win was on December 24). Mayfield was named the NFL Rookie of the Week for Week 3.

On September 24, Mayfield was named the team's starting quarterback moving forward.

Week 4: at Oakland Raiders

The Browns took a 17–7 lead into halftime on the strength of Nick Chubb's first career touchdown run and Baker Mayfield's first career touchdown pass, although Mayfield also threw an interception that was returned for a Raiders touchdown. The Browns built up a 28–14 lead in the third quarter, but the Raiders then scored 20 straight points aided by two Mayfield fumbles and a 51-yard punt return which gave the Raiders short fields to work with. The Browns finally answered with touchdown runs by Carlos Hyde and Chubb to take a 42–34 lead in the fourth quarter. The Browns were unable to run the clock out and punted to the Raiders, giving them one last opportunity to tie the game. The Raiders scored a touchdown and game-tying two-point conversion with 0:30 left, to send the game into overtime. The Raiders won the game, 45–42 on a Matt McCrane field goal in the overtime period. This was the first time the Browns scored 30 or more points since 2015, and the first time the team scored 40 or more points since 2009.

With the loss, the Browns fell to 1–2–1. Chubb was named NFL Rookie of the Week after his 105-yard, two-touchdown performance.

Week 5: vs. Baltimore Ravens

Both offenses struggled to gain any rhythm during the game. The Ravens could only score nine points on three Justin Tucker field goals, while the Browns scored nine points on a Baker Mayfield touchdown pass to Rashard Higgins and a Greg Joseph field goal. Joseph, who missed an extra point, had an opportunity to win the game at the end of regulation, but missed a 55-yard field goal attempt. In overtime, both teams were held scoreless during their first two possessions. However, with 0:02 remaining, Joseph hit a 37-yard field goal to win the game.

With the win, the Browns improved to 2–2–1. The Browns ended an 18-game winless streak within the AFC North that dated back to the 2015 season. CB Denzel Ward, who recorded an interception and a blocked field goal, was named NFL Rookie of the Week for the second time this season. It also marked the fourth time in five weeks a Browns player won the award. Ward was also named the AFC special teams player of the week. Jarvis Landry recorded his 427th career reception, passing Larry Fitzgerald for the most receptions in his first five NFL seasons.

Week 6: vs. Los Angeles Chargers

The Chargers dominated the game. Chargers' quarterback Philip Rivers passed for 207 yards, two touchdowns, and one interception and running back Melvin Gordon added 132 rushing yards and three touchdowns. The Los Angeles defense sacked Browns' quarterback Baker Mayfield five times and had two interceptions. The Chargers defeated the Browns 38–14.

With the loss, the Browns fell to 2–3–1.

On October 19, the Browns traded RB Carlos Hyde to the Jacksonville Jaguars in exchange for a 2019 fifth-round selection.

Week 7: at Tampa Bay Buccaneers

The Buccaneers opened a 16–2 lead in the second quarter on the a Jameis Winston touchdown pass to DeSean Jackson and a Winston touchdown run. The Browns answered early in the third quarter with a Baker Mayfield touchdown pass to David Njoku, but Tampa Bay answered on a Ronald Jones run near the end of the quarter. The Browns scored two touchdowns in the fourth quarter on a Nick Chubb run and a Mayfield pass to Jarvis Landry to force overtime. In overtime, Buccaneers kicker Chandler Catanzaro, who had earlier missed an extra point and a 40-yard field goal attempt, hit a 59-yard field goal to win the game.

With the loss, the Browns fell to 2–4–1. Mayfield was named NFL Rookie of the Week for Week 7, marking his second such honor and the fifth time a Browns player was named Rookie of the Week this season.

Week 8: at Pittsburgh Steelers

The Browns traveled to Pittsburgh for a Week 8 battle with their AFC North rival Steelers. The Browns opened the scoring with a pair of Greg Joseph field goals, but the Steelers answered with two Ben Roethlisberger touchdown passes to Antonio Brown to take a 14–6 lead into halftime. The Browns gave up a safety on a holding penalty early in the third quarter to extend the Steelers' lead to 10, but Pittsburgh failed to secure the ensuing free kick, giving the Browns possession in Pittsburgh territory. The Browns capitalized on a Baker Mayfield touchdown pass to Antonio Callaway, cutting the lead to 16–12. The Steelers then pulled away with 17 straight points and come away with a 33–18 win.

With the loss, the Browns fell to 2–5–1. This marked the Browns' 15th consecutive loss in Pittsburgh.

On October 29, head coach Hue Jackson and offensive coordinator Todd Haley were fired. Defensive coordinator Gregg Williams was named the interim head coach for the remainder of the season. Freddie Kitchens was the interim offensive coordinator.

Week 9: vs. Kansas City Chiefs

With the loss, the Browns fell to 2-6-1. Mayfield was named NFL Rookie of the Week for the third time this season.

Week 10: vs. Atlanta Falcons

The Browns opened the scoring with a Baker Mayfield touchdown pass to Rashard Higgins – the team's first touchdown scored in the first quarter of any game this season. However, the Falcons scored the next 10 points before the Browns scored a touchdown on a Mayfield pass to Nick Chubb to take a 14–10 led into halftime. The Browns opened up their lead to 28–10 in the third quarter on a Mayfield pass to Duke Johnson and a Chubb run of 92 yards – the longest run in Browns' franchise history. Atlanta added a late fourth-quarter touchdown to make the final score 28–16.

With the win, the Browns went into their bye week at 3–6–1. Chubb was named the FedEx Ground Player of the Week and the NFL Rookie of the Week. This marked Chubb's second Rookie of the Week award and the team's seventh in 2018.

Week 12: at Cincinnati Bengals

The Browns raced to a 28–0 lead late in the second quarter. They scored touchdowns on their first four drives with a Nick Chubb run and Baker Mayfield passes to Antonio Callaway, David Njoku, and Chubb. The Bengals responded with an Andy Dalton touchdown pass to John Ross to close the Browns' lead to 28–7 at halftime. Mayfield threw a fourth touchdown pass, this one to Darren Fells, to extend the Browns' lead to 35–7. The Bengals closed the gap to 35–20 with a touchdown pass and run by backup quarterback Jeff Driskel, who filled in for an injured Dalton, but the Browns held on for the win.

With the win, the Browns improved to 4–6–1. The Browns won consecutive games for the first time since 2014, snapped a seven-game losing streak to the Bengals, and ended their 25-game losing streak in away games, one short of tying the 2007–10 Detroit Lions record of 26 straight away losses. Mayfield was named the NFL Rookie of the Week for the fourth time this season. Mayfield was also named the NFL Offensive Rookie of the Month for November.

Week 13: at Houston Texans

The Texans built a 23–0 lead in the first half, on the strength of a Deshaun Watson touchdown pass, a Zach Cunningham interception return for a touchdown, and three field goals. The Browns got onto the scoreboard in the third quarter with a Nick Chubb touchdown run and added a Baker Mayfield touchdown pass to Rashard Higgins, but the Texans prevailed 29–13. Mayfield set a Browns rookie record with 398 passing yards, but was hurt by three interceptions.

With the loss, the Browns fell to 4–7–1.

Week 14: vs. Carolina Panthers

The game went back and forth between the two teams. The Panthers scored two first-half touchdowns on Christian McCaffrey runs, while the Browns had two first half touchdowns on a Jarvis Landry run and a Landry catch. The teams exchanged field goals late in the second quarter to make the score 17–17 at halftime. After a Panthers field goal, Nick Chubb added a touchdown run early in the fourth quarter to take the lead for good, as the Browns won 26–20.

With the win, the Browns improved to 5–7–1 and secured their first winning record at home since the 2007 season. QB Baker Mayfield received his fifth NFL Rookie of the Week honor this season.

Week 15: at Denver Broncos

The Browns traveled to Denver for a Saturday night game against the Broncos. Assistant defensive coordinator Blake Williams, son of interim head coach Gregg Williams, got his first play-calling duties in this game.

With the win, the Browns improved to 6–7–1. The win ended an 11-game losing streak to the Broncos that dated back to 1990. However, the following day, the Steelers defeated the Patriots to improve to 8–5–1 and mathematically eliminated the Browns from AFC North title contention. This will be the Browns' 26th consecutive season without a division title, the longest active streak in the NFL. A Tennessee Titans win over the Washington Redskins mathematically eliminated the Browns from playoff contention.

Week 16: vs. Cincinnati Bengals

On December 22, the day before the Browns' Week 16 contest, the Tennessee Titans won their Week 16 game to improve to 9–6 and mathematically eliminate the Browns from postseason contention for the 16th consecutive season. Despite being eliminated, the Browns looked to finish their season on a high note with two division wins to end the season.

The Browns hosted the Bengals and former head coach Hue Jackson, who was hired as an assistant with the Bengals. Baker Mayfield threw three touchdown passes and Nick Chubb added 112 rushing yards to give the Browns a 26–3 lead early in the fourth quarter. Cincinnati scored a pair of late touchdowns to make it a one-possession game, but the Browns held on for the 26–18 win.

With the win, the Browns improved to 7–7–1 and finished with a 5–2–1 record at home, their best home record since 2007, when they went 7–1 at home. It was their first three-game winning streak since 2014 and their first season sweep of the Bengals since 2002. They also secured a winning record within the AFC North for the first time since the division was formed in 2002.

Week 17: at Baltimore Ravens

The Browns entered the final game of the season attempting to play the role of spoiler, as the Ravens needed a win – or a Steelers loss – to clinch the AFC North title.

The Ravens built a 20–7 halftime lead on the strength of two touchdown runs by fellow rookie QB Lamar Jackson. The Browns' score was on a Baker Mayfield 28-yard pass to former Raven Breshad Perriman. While the Ravens maintained their lead throughout the game, Mayfield added two touchdown passes in the second half, including a strike to Antonio Callaway to cut the Ravens' lead to 26–24 with 3:24 remaining. The Browns had one more chance, but Mayfield threw an interception to C.J. Mosley to seal the game.

With the loss, the Browns finished the season 7–8–1, marking their 11th consecutive losing season, which is a franchise record and the longest active streak in the NFL. The Browns finished 2–6 in away games. Mayfield won his seventh Rookie of the Week award.

Standings

Division

Conference

Team leaders

Individual honors
Four Browns players, G Joel Bitonio, DE Myles Garrett, WR Jarvis Landry, and CB Denzel Ward, were named to the AFC Roster for the 2019 Pro Bowl. Garrett was voted as a starter and Ward as a reserve. Bitonio and Landry were named as alternates and later named to the AFC roster to replace injured players. This marked Landry's fourth consecutive and fourth overall Pro Bowl appearance, and the first appearance for the three other players.

In addition, RB Nick Chubb and P Britton Colquitt were named second alternates and QB Baker Mayfield and G Kevin Zeitler were named fourth alternates at their respective positions.

Bitonio and Garrett were also named to the All-Pro second team

Chubb and Mayfield were nominated for the NFL Offensive Rookie of the Year award, however both fell short to the eventual winner, New York Giants RB Saquon Barkley.

References

External links
  
 2018 Cleveland Browns at Pro Football Reference (Profootballreference.com)
 2018 Cleveland Browns Statistics at jt-sw.com
 2018 Cleveland Browns Schedule at jt-sw.com
 2018 Cleveland Browns at DatabaseFootball.com  

Cleveland
Cleveland Browns seasons
Cleveland Browns